Bryan McGregor (born June 27, 1984) is a British–Canadian professional ice hockey player. He played with HC Oceláři Třinec in the Czech Extraliga for parts of the 2010–11 and 2011–12 seasons. In mid-October 2011, McGregor was acquired with cash by Energie Karlovy Vary for Petr Gřegořek. However, the trade was voided due to an injury McGregor sustained.

McGregor was born to Scottish emigrants Michael McGregor and Margaret (Trusdale) McGregor. He has one sister, Maegan. McGregor was in a short term relationship with 2005 winner of Miss Canada International, Nicole Kostrosky. He speaks English, French, Czech, and Russian, the third of which he learned while playing with HC Oceláři Třinec.

References

External links 
 

1984 births
Living people
Binghamton Senators players
Canadian ice hockey right wingers
HC Oceláři Třinec players
Ice hockey people from Ontario
Idaho Steelheads (ECHL) players
Johnstown Chiefs players
Minnesota Duluth Bulldogs men's ice hockey players
Norfolk Admirals (ECHL) players
Pensacola Ice Pilots players
Sportspeople from Niagara Falls, Ontario
Vernon Vipers players
Canadian expatriate ice hockey players in the Czech Republic
Canadian expatriate ice hockey players in the United States
Canadian expatriate ice hockey players in Finland
HC TWK Innsbruck players
Rungsted Seier Capital players
Beibarys Atyrau players
Fehérvár AV19 players
Podhale Nowy Targ players
Piráti Chomutov players
Brampton Beast players
Hamilton Steelhawks players
HKM Zvolen players
Canadian expatriate ice hockey players in Kazakhstan
Canadian expatriate ice hockey players in Slovakia
Canadian expatriate ice hockey players in Romania
Canadian expatriate ice hockey players in Hungary
Canadian expatriate ice hockey players in Poland
Canadian expatriate ice hockey players in Austria
Canadian expatriate ice hockey players in Denmark
Canadian people of Scottish descent